Stonebridge Press, Inc. is a privately held newspaper company based in Southbridge, Massachusetts. It was formed October 27, 1995, to operate the newspapers acquired through the purchase of a various newspapers.

In addition to its Massachusetts operations, the company owns the Salmon Press group of weekly newspapers of New Hampshire and also publishes four weekly newspapers in Northeast Connecticut under the name Villager Newspapers. In total, Stonebridge Press, Inc. publishes 23 newspapers reaching over 200,000 households in Massachusetts, Connecticut, and New Hampshire.  The company also publishes niche publications, specialty guides, special sections, and websites. All Stonebridge and Salmon products are also available online. 
Stonebridge Press is headquartered at the historic Southbridge News building, 25 Elm Street, Southbridge.

History 
Former executives with Capital Cities/ABC  purchased the newspapers that now make up Stonebridge in a foreclosure sale from Loren F. Ghiglione in 1995. The price was not disclosed.

The deal, brokered by Fidelity Investments' Community Newspaper Company subsidiary—one of Ghiglione's largest creditors—suddenly ended a 26-year run of media expansion described by one observer as "Loren Ghiglione's News Empire".

Worcester County Newspapers 
Ghiglione's quarter-century foray in Central Massachusetts journalism—known in its final years as Worcester County Newspapers—began when he purchased the Southbridge Evening News from its founding McNitt family in 1969. Throughout the 1970s and 1980s, he acquired weekly newspapers, specialty publications and shoppers in adjacent communities, some 20 in all. By 1988, the chain had a circulation of 241,000, said to be the largest overall readership of any publishing company in the region. Ghiglione also oversaw a healthy commercial printing operation at the newspaper presses.

In addition to the Evening News and what became the Stonebridge weeklies, Worcester County Newspapers included several titles that were eventually folded: The Voice, a weekly covering Boylston, Northborough, Shrewsbury and Westborough, Massachusetts; Wachusett People, a shopper in Holden and West Boylston, Massachusetts; a chain of three Weekender shoppers in southern Worcester County; The Observer Patriot, a weekly in Putnam, Connecticut; and the Jaffrey-Rindge Chronicle in Jaffrey, New Hampshire.

By the end of the decade, however, Ghiglione's "empire" began to look overextended and uneconomic. In 1986 he had paid US$3 million for two state-of-the-art presses at Worcester County Newspapers' Auburn plant. In 1987, he'd bought Worcester Magazine, an alternative newsweekly with a large staff. As the 1990s approached, the region entered an economic recession, tanking demand for commercial printing, while newsprint costs went up. In 1992, the competitor Telegram & Gazette daily in Worcester beefed up its suburban coverage with zoned editions, dealing another setback to Worcester County Newspapers.

Attempts to stay afloat 
The company's profits in 1985 were estimated at US$1 million per year. Ten years later, the company was US$3.5 million in long-term debt, with another US$1.9 million in unpaid bills.

Ghiglione attempted to stay afloat by reorganizing. He had already sold Worcester Magazine in 1990; in early 1995 he shuttered the Shrewsbury, Holden, and Putnam papers, which were losing money. The Evening News dropped its Saturday edition and switched to tabloid-sized newsprint. The Auburn printing plant was sold to Community Newspaper Company. Following the loss of the Auburn plant, the remaining newspapers were printed by contract with Turley Publications' presses in Palmer, Massachusetts.

It wasn't enough. Ghiglione was bankrupt, and deeded the company over to Community Newspaper in October, effectively firing his 87 employees. Only 58 were rehired by Stonebridge. The papers were said to have a combined circulation of 90,000 at the time of the sale, far less than half the company's peak readership in the 1980s.

Local focus returns 
Ghiglione, who had built a reputation as a scholar of journalism, became a professional in residence at the Newseum, a museum of journalism in Washington, D.C. At the time of the sale, some of Ghiglione's former associates faulted him for spending too much time on news theory and high-flown journalism, and not enough on basic community news. George Geers, a longtime Southbridge Evening News editor, said "He was very good and very successful at playing the role of a small-town editor who could mingle and hold his own with big city, big paper publishers. ... But the issues he was really concerned with were not the local issues. The people of Southbridge were concerned with overcrowding at the high school or building a new police station, and Loren just wasn't all that interested in those things."

Stonebridge Press expanded into northeastern Connecticut in 2005 by launching The Putnam Villager and two (later three) other free weekly newspapers, all under the Villager banner. The Villager name is also used for new free weekly newspapers started in July 2007 as The Sturbridge Villager, serving every home in Sturbridge, Massachusetts as well as every home in Wales, Holland, and Brimfield, Massachusetts.  At the same time, the company launched the Charlton Villager, reaching every home in Charlton, Massachusetts.  It also marked a period of change in circulation and distribution, as the Webster Times, Spencer New Leader, and Blackstone Valley Tribune were converted to free total market coverage weeklies, mailed to each home in the papers' coverage areas. By remaining "relentlessly local", the company has been successful in outperforming larger daily newspapers, even during the economic turbulence of 2008–2013.

References 

Newspapers published in Massachusetts
Mass media in Worcester County, Massachusetts